Seely House or Seelye House may refer to:

in the United Kingdom
Houses of the Seely Baronets, including Sherwood Lodge in Arnold in the County of Nottingham and Brooke House in Brooke on the Isle of Wight

in the United States
Seth Seelye House, Bethel, Connecticut, listed on the NRHP in Fairfield County, Connecticut 
A. B. Seelye House, Abilene, Kansas, listed on the NRHP in Dickinson County, Kansas
Seely/Wright House, Oyster Bay, New York, a local historical landmark known also as Seely House
Dr. John W. Seely House, Howland Corners, Ohio, listed on the NRHP in Trumbull County, Ohio
John H. Seely House, Mount Pleasant, Utah, listed on the NRHP in Sanpete County, Utah